Persephone (minor planet designation: 399 Persephone) is a main belt asteroid. It was discovered by German astronomer Max Wolf on 23 February 1895 in Heidelberg.

References

External links
 
 

Background asteroids
Persephone
Persephone
X-type asteroids (SMASS)
18950223